Peach Fuzz is the sixth studio album from the American rock band Enuff Z'Nuff. Like the band's 1994 release 1985, this album is viewed more as an archival release than a new album since it features mostly previously recorded material. For example, the tracks "Let It Go" and "Kitty" were initially b-sides to the UK edition of the Strength single "Mother's Eyes," while the song "Happy Holiday" was first intended for the 1992 film Home Alone 2. Many of the remaining tracks on Peach Fuzz were recorded during the making of the 1993 album Animals with Human Intelligence, but were likely excluded from that release due to their poppier sounding nature.

At the time of release, the album was largely ignored in the band's concert set lists, with the exception of "Vacant Love". In more recent years, the song "Kitty" has also been performed. Although no singles were released from the album, "Happy Holiday" has turned into one of the band's more popular songs due to its inclusion in Christmas themed CD's such as Monster Ballads XMas  and We Wish You a Hairy Christmas.

Peach Fuzz was initially released in Japan with a slightly different track order and a bonus track. It was later re-issued in the United States in 2008 with the original Japanese track order reinstated along with different artwork. A liner note commentary for all versions was penned by Chris Nadler, an editor at Request and Creem.

Track listing

Personnel
Enuff Z'Nuff
Donnie Vie – lead vocals, guitars and keyboards, producer, mixing
Chip Z'Nuff – bass guitar, guitars and vocals, producer, mixing
Ricky Parent – drums

Additional personnel
Vik Foxx – drums on "Let It Go"
Darren Householder – guitar on "Vacant Love"
Mic Fabus – guitar on "Message of Love"
Mark Bonjovi – guitar on "Happy Holiday"
Derek Frigo – lead guitar on tracks 2, 6, 7, and 8
Charles Fleischer – monologue on "Kitty"

Production
Phil Kaffel, Phil Bonanno, Chris Shepard, Paul Lani, Johnny K, Chris Demonk, Dave Mauragas, Tom Lipnick, Dan Grayless, Jeff Luif  – engineers
Chris Shepard, Paul Lani, Johnny K, Donnie Vie, Phil Kaffel, Phil Bonnanno, Chris Demonk, Chip Z'Nuff, Dave Mauragas – mixing
Konrad Strauss – mastering

Release history

References 

Enuff Z'nuff albums
1996 albums
Caroline Records albums
Albums recorded at A&M Studios